Shihua (Shanghainese: zah4ho3 ka1dau2; literally "petrification") is a subdistrict and the seat of Jinshan District, in the southern extremity of Shanghai. , it has 25 residential communities (社区) under its administration.

See also 
 List of township-level divisions of Shanghai

References 

Township-level divisions of Shanghai